La Pellerine may refer to the following places in France:

 La Pellerine, Maine-et-Loire, a commune in the Maine-et-Loire department
 La Pellerine, Mayenne, a commune in the Mayenne department